In the Mood is a studio album by jazz trumpeter Chet Baker and the Mariachi Brass recorded in 1966 and released on the World Pacific label.

Most of the songs were previously recorded by Glenn Miller from 1939 to 1942. The exception is the theme song from the television show The Dating Game, which began airing in 1965. This record was recorded shortly before Baker got injured by thugs leaving him unable to play his instrument for a couple of years.

Reception

Allmusic rated the album with 1 star, stating: "This LP, which has absolutely terrible arrangements of songs associated with Glenn Miller finds Baker halfheartedly playing some of the boring melodies."

The album was released in the U.S., Canada, France, Australia, and New Zealand.

Track listing
 "Sunrise Serenade" (Frankie Carle, Jack Lawrence) - 2:15   
 "At Last" (Mack Gordon, Harry Warren) - 2:35   
 "Chattanooga Choo Choo" (Gordon, Warren) - 2:42   
 "Serenade In Blue" (Gordon, Warren) - 2:27   
 "In the Mood" (Wingy Manone, Andy Razaf, Joe Garland) - 2:45   
 "(I've Got a Gal In) Kalamazoo" (Gordon, Warren) - 2:30   
 "Little Brown Jug" (Joseph Winner) - 1:49   
 "Tuxedo Junction" (Erskine Hawkins, Bill Johnson, Julian Dash) - 2:38   
 "String of Pearls" (Jerry Gray, Eddie DeLange) - 2:45   
 "Moonlight Serenade" (Glenn Miller, Mitchell Parish) - 2:36   
 "Pennsylvania 6-5000" (Carl Sigman, Gray) - 1:55   
 "The Dating Game" (Chuck Barris, David Mook) - 2:10

Personnel
Chet Baker - flugelhorn
The Mariachi Brass
George Tipton - arranger, conductor

References 

1966 albums
Chet Baker albums
Pacific Jazz Records albums
Albums arranged by George Tipton